Elk Pond Mountain is a peak of the Blue Ridge Mountains, on the border of Nelson and Rockbridge counties in Virginia. 
Elk Pond Mountain is flanked to the east by Maintop Mountain, and to the southwest by Rocky Mountain.

Elk Pond Mountain stands within the watershed of the James River, which drains into Chesapeake Bay.
The east side of Elk Pond Mtn. drains into the North Fork of the Piney River, thence into the Tye River and the James River.
The northeastern side of the north end of Elk Pond Mtn. drains into Mill Creek, thence into the South Fork of the Tye River.
The northwest side of the north end of Elk Pond Mtn. drains into the headwaters of Irish Creek, thence into the South River, the Maury River, and the James River.
The west side of Elk Pond Mtn. drains into Nettle Creek, thence into Irish Creek.

Elk Pond Mountain is in the George Washington National Forest.
The Appalachian Trail, a 2,170-mile (3,500-km) National Scenic Trail from Georgia to Maine, runs along east side of Elk Pond Mtn.

External links 
  
 

Mountains of Virginia
Mountains of Nelson County, Virginia
Mountains of Rockbridge County, Virginia
Mountains on the Appalachian Trail
Blue Ridge Mountains